Graf Carl Ernst Maria Fidel Alfred Anton Fugger von Glött, since 1914: Fürst Fugger von Glött (2 July 1859, Oberndorf am Lech – 25 April 1940, Kirchheim in Schwaben) was a member of the noble family of the Fugger. He was a jurist, president of the imperial council of the crown of Bavaria and royal colonel marshal of the Kingdom of Bavaria. Furthermore, he was Lord of Kirchheim in Schwaben, Lord of Oberndorf and Count of Kirchberg and Weißenhorn.

Biography
Carl Ernst Fürst Fugger von Glött was the oldest of seven children and one of four sons of Ernst Graf Fugger von Glött, Lord of Oberndorf and Lord of Kirchheim (14 August 1821 – 11 February 1885) and Maria Luise Alexandra, Freiin von Künsberg (5 Juni 1834-9 Oktober 1901).

He visited the clerical residential schools in Metten und Feldkirch/Vorarlberg and studied laws at the universities Munich, Würzburg and Erlangen.
As a jurist he was working in Donauwörth, Passau, Bamberg and Lindau. On 1 November 1891 he married in Moss near Lindau the daughter of count Friedrich zu Moos, Elisabeth countess of Quadt-Wykradt-Isny (11 September 1862 – 16 August 1940). With her he had three children: Anna Friederike Elisabeth Maria, Countess Fugger von Glött (10 February 1893 – 25 December 1962), Maria Countess Fugger von Glött (29 April 1894 – 1935) and Joseph-Ernst Graf Fugger von Glött (26 October 1895 – 13 May 1981).

From 2 October 1891 to 1918 he was as a hereditable (formerly corporative) imperial counselor member of the imperial council (ger. Reichsrat) of the crown of Bavaria and from 1911 to the end of the Kingdom of Bavaria in 1918 president of the imperial council (ger. Reichsrat) of the crown of Bavaria. Together with count Georg von Hertling and count Maximilian von Soden-Fraunhofen he had a crucial share in the proclamation of Ludwig III to be the king. On 18 January 1914 he was awarded the hereditable rank of a prince (ger. Fürst) for his merits for the Kingdom of Bavaria.

As a confident Catholic he had the heraldic motto 'God and Mary'. In 1901 he was awarded for his charitable work by Pope Leo XIII with the grand cross of the Order of St. Gregory the Great. Since 1904 he has been honorary citizen of Kirchheim in Schwaben because of his charitable and cultural merits, especially for public education. He had also an important role in the implementation of the railway line Pfaffenhausen-Kirchheim.

On 9 May 1918 he was appointed to be royal colonel marshal of the Kingdom of Bavaria. But he could hold this position only until November 1918 because of the end of the monarchy by the November Revolution.

From 1922 to 1938 he was supervisory board member of the Bayerische Hypotheken- und Wechselbank, which opposed the Nazi dictatorship. From 1931 to 1938 he had the position of the chairman of the supervisory board of the bank.

Carl Ernst Fürst Fugger von Glött died on 25 April 1940 in Kirchheim in Schwaben and is buried there.

Notes/Further reading
 Bosl, Karl (Hg.): Bosls Bayerische Biographie: 8000 Persönlichkeiten aus 15 Jahrhunderten. Regensburg 1983; Ergänzungsband 1988.

See also
Fugger
Kirchheim in Schwaben

References

External links
 

Members of the Bavarian Reichsrat
Knights Grand Cross of the Order of St Gregory the Great
Carl Ernst
Jurists from Bavaria
German bankers
1859 births
1940 deaths
Counts of Germany
Bavarian nobility
German Roman Catholics
People from Donau-Ries